The Bléone is a  long river in the Alpes-de-Haute-Provence département, southeastern France. Its source is several small streams converging near the refuge de l'Estrop, a mountain shelter in Prads-Haute-Bléone. It flows generally southwest. It is a left tributary of the Durance into which it flows between L'Escale and Les Mées.

Communes along its course
This list is ordered from source to mouth: Prads-Haute-Bléone, La Javie, Le Brusquet, Marcoux, Digne-les-Bains, Aiglun, Mallemoisson, Le Chaffaut-Saint-Jurson, Mirabeau, Malijai, L'Escale, Les Mées,

References

Rivers of France
Rivers of Alpes-de-Haute-Provence
Rivers of Provence-Alpes-Côte d'Azur
Braided rivers in France